Atlacomulco de Fabela (Atlacomolco in Nahuatl, Mbado in Otomi and Mbaro in Mazahua) is a town and municipal seat of the Atlacomulco Municipality, State of Mexico in Mexico.

References

Atlacomulco
Populated places in the State of Mexico
Municipality seats in the State of Mexico
Otomi settlements
Mazahua settlements